The International Island Games Association (IIGA) is the organising body for the Island Games, a friendly biennial multi-sport competition between teams from several European islands and other small territories (24 Members from 7 Nations).  The IIGA liaises with the member island associations and with sponsors of the games. It investigates whether islands wanting to join fit the membership criteria.

Members 
The IIGA was founded in the Isle of Man in 1985. Constituents come from islands in, or associated with, seven sovereign states (Denmark, Estonia, Finland, Norway, Spain, Sweden, and the United Kingdom). The 24 current members of the IIGA are:

 
 

 

 

 

 

 
 
 

Gibraltar is the only member of the IIGA that is not an island or group of islands as it is a peninsula of Iberia, sharing a land border with Spain. Ynys Môn (Anglesey), Frøya and Hitra have bridge or tunnel connections to their mainland. Greenland is by far the largest island, and is magnitudes bigger than all the rest combined, but is very sparsely populated. Former members of the IIGA include the countries Iceland and Malta, the province Prince Edward Island, and Rhodes.

By Country
 (2):Faroe Islands - Greenland
 (1):Saare County
 (1):Åland
 (1):Gozo
 (2):Frøya - Hitra 
 (1):Menorca
 (1):Gotland
 (15):Alderney - Bermuda - Cayman Islands - Falkland Islands - Gibraltar - Guernsey - Isle of Man - Isle of Wight - Jersey - Orkney - Saint Helena - Sark - Shetland - Western Isles - Ynys Môn

Membership criteria
The IIGA constitution lists the criteria which would apply to new applicants. These limit applications to island territories with populations less than 125,000. There must be a local association of governing bodies of at least two sports in the IIGA program at which the island can "adequately" compete. Membership is limited to 25.

References

External links 
 IIGA website
 The 2015 Island Games was hosted by Jersey, United Kingdom
 The 2017 Island Games was hosted by Gotland, Sweden

Organizations established in 1985
1985 establishments in the United Kingdom